Pierre-Hugues Herbert and Nicolas Mahut defeated Raven Klaasen and Michael Venus in the final, 6–3, 6–4 to win the doubles tennis title at the 2019 ATP Finals.

Mike Bryan and Jack Sock were the reigning champions, but Sock did not qualify this year. Bryan qualified alongside his brother Bob, but they withdrew before the tournament.

Seeds

Alternates

Draw

Finals

Group Max Mirnyi

Group Jonas Björkman

Standings are determined by: 1. number of wins; 2. number of matches; 3. in two-players-ties, head-to-head results; 4. in three-players-ties, percentage of sets won, then head-to-head result (if two players tied in percentage of sets won and third one is "different") or percentage of games won if all three players have same percentage of sets won, then head-to-head results; 5. ATP rankings.

References

External links 
Official website
Draw

Doubles